Mateo de Sagade de Bugueyro also Mateo Segade Bugueiro or Mateo Sagade Bugueyro (1605 – 28 August 1672) was a Spanish Catholic prelate who served as Archbishop (Personal Title) of Cartagena (1664–1672) and Archbishop of Mexico (1655–1664).

Biography
Mateo de Sagade de Bugueyro was born in Pontevedra, Spain. On 14 May 1655, he selected by the King of Spain and confirmed by Pope Alexander VII as Archbishop of Mexico. On 25 July 1656, he was consecrated bishop by Juan Merlo de la Fuente, Bishop of Comayagua with Pedro de Barrientos Lomelin, Bishop of Durango serving as co-consecrator. On 28 January 1664, he was appointed by Pope Alexander VII as Archbishop (Personal Title) of Cartagena. He served as Archbishop of Cartagena until his death on 28 August 1672.

Episcopal succession
While bishop, he was the principal consecrator of:
Juan Alonso de Cuevas y Davalos, Bishop of Antequera, Oaxaca (1658); 
Juan Aguirre y Gorozpe, Bishop of Durango (1660); and 
Antonio Fernández del Campo Angulo y Velasco, Bishop of Tui (1666).

References

External links and additional sources
 (for Chronology of Bishops) 
 (for Chronology of Bishops) 
 (for Chronology of Bishops) 
 (for Chronology of Bishops) 

1672 deaths
17th-century Roman Catholic archbishops in Mexico
17th-century Roman Catholic archbishops in Spain
Roman Catholic archbishops of Mexico (city)
Spanish Roman Catholic bishops in North America
Bishops appointed by Pope Alexander VII
1605 births